Bhutan competed at the 2016 Asian Beach Games held in Danang, Vietnam from 24 September to 3 October 2016.

Competitors

2016 in Bhutanese sport
Nations at the 2016 Asian Beach Games
Bhutan at the Asian Games